Nightline ( literally Time-barred) is a 2022 Czech crime thriller film directed by Robert Sedláček. It stars Karel Roden. Inspired by real events - the motive is a time-barred murder - the film is set in the time of its creation. The screenplay was written by Robert Sedláček, who also directed it. Filming took place in 2020 mainly in Prague at night, and partly in the American Malibu. It is the first film in Czech cinematography that takes place almost in real time. It was presented to journalists on 26 April 2022; the premiere, originally planned for February 2021, took place on April 28 of the following year due to the closure of cinemas due to measures against the coronavirus epidemic.

Cast
Karel Roden as Radek
Barbora Bočková as Eva Sommerová
Igor Bareš	
Vladimír Kratina	
Karel Jirák as himself
Denisa Barešová as Eliška Vachková
Vilma Cibulková as matka Elišky
Michal Holán as Eva's colleague
Michal Dalecký as Eva's colleague
Eva Decastelo as Receptionist
Jiří Chum as Czech Radio moderator
Ernesto Čekan

Production
Jiří Tuček, once the youngest producer in the history of a Czech feature film, became the producer of Promlčeno. The film had a specific background. The director Mirek Veselý started filming the original Promlčeno, but his producers did not finish filming in the end and handed over the idea for a new filming to Donart production. Shooting concluded on 2 October 2020.

Distribution
The main distribution channel of the film became the network of Czech cinemas and multiplexes distributed by Bontonfilm; Prima received the exclusive license to broadcast the film on television.

Music
The music for Nightline was commissioned by independent bands and creators Michal Rataj, Oskar Török and Luboš Soukup; the sound was provided by Robert Slezák.

References

External links
 
 Nightline at CSFD.cz 

2022 films
2022 crime thriller films
Czech crime thriller films
2020s Czech-language films